Deshabandu Handunnettige Deepthi Priyantha Kumar Dharmasena (born 24 April 1971), popularly as Kumar Dharmasena, is a Sri Lankan cricket umpire and former international cricketer. He is a member of the ICC Elite Panel Umpires and the first and only person to represent an ICC World Cup Final both as a player and an umpire. He was a right-handed batsman and a right-arm off break bowler.

Playing career 
Dharmasena was born in Colombo on 24 April 1971.  He started his cricketing career as a teenager at Nalanda College Colombo. His first foray into international cricket was in 1994 against South Africa.

His obscure action made him perfect for bowling in one-day matches, yet Dharmasena also proved a useful batsman, especially after he was investigated in 1998 by the ICC for overstretching his bowling action to illegal proportions. Having been cleared in July 2000, he played for the one-day team on several occasions since, but rarely played Test cricket.

Dharmasena was the 59th Sri Lankan cricketer to receive a Test cap (Sri Lanka v South Africa at Colombo Sinhalese Sports Club 1993).

Kumar Dharmasena has the record for playing the most number of ODI innings before being dismissed for a duck (72 innings).

He along with Dulip Liyanage set the record for the highest 8th wicket runstand for Sri Lanka in ODI cricket (91).

Move to umpiring
Following his retirement from playing in November 2006, Dharmasena announced plans to become a competitive umpire, as he wished to remain "close to the game which I love so dearly". Prior to his retirement, he had already umpired several domestic matches in the Sara Trophy, the major first-class cricket tournament in Sri Lanka. He umpired his first international match in 2009, overseeing the one-day international between India and Sri Lanka at the Rangiri International Stadium in Dambulla: he remains the youngest ever Sri Lankan to umpire any international match. He umpired at the 2011 Cricket World Cup, and was appointed to the Elite Panel of ICC Umpires later that year. Dharmasena was named the Umpire of the Year at the 2012 ICC Awards, for which he received the David Shepherd Trophy.

He was selected as one of the twenty umpires to stand in matches during the 2015 Cricket World Cup and umpired in the final.  In doing so he became the first to play in and to umpire World Cup finals. He stood in the final of the 2016 ICC World Twenty20.

Kumar Dharmasena has worked as an umpire in 18 matches of ICC World T20, the most by any umpire from Sri Lanka.

In January 2019, he won the David Shepherd Trophy for the ICC Umpire of the Year at the 2018 ICC Awards. In April 2019, he was named as one of the sixteen umpires to stand in matches during the 2019 Cricket World Cup. In July 2019, he was named as one of the two on-field umpires for the second semi-final match, between Australia and England. Later the same month, he was also named as one of the two on-field umpires for the Cricket World Cup Final. England won the match in a Super Over. He admitted an error but said he did not regret it. If the decision were correct, England would have required 4 runs to win off the last 2 balls but there's no certainty that they would have lost either.  

He also umpired 2022 t20 worldcup finals between Pakistan and England.

Records
 Dharmasena is the only person to have played in a Final of the Cricket World Cup as well as officiated in the final of the World Cup. He had played in the 1996 Cricket World Cup Final and featured as an on-field umpire twice in 2015 and 2019 World Cup finals.

See also
 List of Test cricket umpires
 List of One Day International cricket umpires
 List of Twenty20 International cricket umpires

References

External links
 

1971 births
Living people
Sri Lanka One Day International cricketers
Sri Lanka Test cricketers
Sri Lankan cricketers
Cricketers at the 1996 Cricket World Cup
Basnahira North cricketers
Nondescripts Cricket Club cricketers
Bloomfield Cricket and Athletic Club cricketers
Sri Lankan Test cricket umpires
Sri Lankan One Day International cricket umpires
Sri Lankan Twenty20 International cricket umpires
Alumni of Nalanda College, Colombo
North Central Province cricketers
Sri Lanka Cricket Combined XI cricketers
Deshabandu